Isagenix International LLC is a privately held multi-level marketing (MLM) company that sells dietary supplements and personal care products. The company, based in Gilbert, Arizona, was founded in 2002 by John Anderson, Jim Cover, and Kathy Cover. In 2017, the company reported revenues of $958 million.  The company has been challenged for making product claims that are not supported by science.

History
Isagenix was founded by John Anderson and Jim and Kathy Cover in 2002. Anderson had previously worked in the nutritional supplement industry and Jim and Kathy Cover had experience in the multi-level marketing industry.

Isagenix expanded into Australia and New Zealand in 2007.

In February 2009, Isagenix was part of a nationwide recall on peanuts thought to be contaminated with Salmonella, which were used by Isagenix in their Chocolate Dipped Honey Peanut Bar. The recall was voluntarily issued by the company, on FDA recommendations. No cases of illness were reported.

Isagenix entered into a business arrangement with biologist William H. Andrews of Sierra Sciences in September 2011, and the following year launched an “anti-aging” product containing several natural compounds that Sierra Sciences had reportedly verified to have "telomere-supporting" properties.

In January 2020, Isagenix International announced its acquisition of  International, a multi-level marketing company based in Lehi, Utah.

The company partnered with TerraCycle in 2021 to recycle product packaging that cannot be processed through municipal programs.

Products and business model
Using a multi-level marketing model, Isagenix sells dietary supplement products, as well as cosmetics. The Isagenix diet involves consuming Isagenix products, low-calorie meals, and shakes for 30 days, along with other products like cleanses and supplements. 

The company also sells "Financial Wellness" product bundles to their multi-level marketing distributors. Distributors are required to actively recruit new members to earn money. The company's promotional materials highlight people earning more than $100k per month; however, most distributors earn less than 500 dollars per year.

Physician Harriet A. Hall published a lengthy critique of Isagenix products in Skeptical Inquirer, in which she said that many of the claims made about the products are false, and that the amount of vitamin A in some of the products is dangerous and goes against the recommendations of The Medical Letter.

According to a report by Australian consumer organization CHOICE, Isagenix makes claims about its "nutritional cleansing" product that are not supported by science, while other Isagenix weight-loss products are similar in content to much cheaper store-bought alternatives. The report also describes instances of unqualified associates providing medical advice about the products, a practice which the company says it does not authorize.

References

External links
 Official website

Multi-level marketing companies
Nutritional supplement companies of the United States
Companies based in Arizona
2002 establishments in Arizona